William Clark Haines (10 January 1810 – 3 February 1866), Australian colonial politician, was the first Premier of Victoria.

Haines was born in London, the son of John Haines, a physician. He was educated at Charterhouse School and Caius College, Cambridge, where he graduated in medicine; he later practiced surgery for several years. In 1835 he married Mary Dugard, with whom he had nine children.

Haines migrated to the Port Phillip District (later Victoria) in 1841 and settled in the Geelong area. He farmed in the area as well as practising as a surgeon. He was appointed a member of the Victorian Legislative Council (then a partly elected, partly appointive body) in 1851, and in 1853 he was elected for district of Grant. He served as colonial secretary 1854–55. Politically, he represented the small farmers against the squatters who owned most of Victoria's land.

When Victoria gained full responsible government in 1855, Haines was leader of the Government. He was commissioned as Victoria's first premier and chief secretary on 28 November 1855 and served until 11 March 1857. Haines was elected to the Legislative Assembly for South Grant in November 1856.  Haines was again premier from April 1857 to March 1858. Haines then visited Europe for three years.  In 1860 he moved to the seat of Portland which he represented until 1864. Haines served as treasurer from 14 November 1861 to 27 June 1863, in the third O'Shanassy government. He served again in the legislative council, representing Eastern Province, from August 1865 until his death in February 1866.

The historian Raymond Wright describes Haines as a bluff, plain "honest farmer" type, who was "much enjoyed for his appalling public speaking." His main concern as premier was to democratise the Constitution which had been drawn up for Victoria by colonial officials before self-government, mainly to protect the interests of the squatter class. A bill was introduced to enlarge the Assembly, redraw electoral boundaries and abolish the property qualification for both votes and candidates. But the unstable situation in the Assembly brought his ministry to an early end.

References

Further sources
Geoff Browne, A Biographical Register of the Victorian Parliament, 1900-84, Government Printer, Melbourne, 1985
Don Garden, Victoria: A History, Thomas Nelson, Melbourne, 1984
Kathleen Thompson and Geoffrey Serle, A Biographical Register of the Victorian Parliament, 1856-1900, Australian National University Press, Canberra, 1972
 Raymond Wright, A People's Counsel. A History of the Parliament of Victoria, 1856-1990, Oxford University Press, Melbourne, 1992

Premiers of Victoria
1810 births
1866 deaths
Politicians from Geelong
People educated at Charterhouse School
Alumni of Gonville and Caius College, Cambridge
English emigrants to colonial Australia
Victoria (Australia) state politicians
Members of the Victorian Legislative Council
Members of the Victorian Legislative Assembly
Treasurers of Victoria 
19th-century Australian politicians
Australian surgeons